The 1934–35 Gauliga Bayern was the second season of the league, one of the 16 Gauligas in Germany at the time. It was the first tier of the football league system in  Bavaria (German:Bayern) from 1933 to 1945.

The  league champions SpVgg Fürth qualified for the 1935 German football championship, where it finished second in its group, behind VfB Stuttgart, an ahead of FC Hanau 93 and SV Jena and was thereby knocked out of the competition. For Fürth it was the only Gauliga championships the club would win in the era from 1933 to 1944.

The 1934–35 season saw the introduction of a cup competition, the Tschammerpokal, now the DFB-Pokal. The inaugural 1935 edition was won by Gauliga Bayern runners-up 1. FC Nürnberg, defeating German champion FC Schalke 04 2–0 on 8 December 1935.

Table
The 1934–35 season saw two new clubs in the league, BC Augsburg and SpVgg Weiden and operated with eleven teams, one less than the previous season.

References

Sources

External links
 Das Deutsche Fussball Archiv  Historic German league tables

1934-35
1